The Lubbock Arts Festival is an annual arts festival held in April at the Lubbock Memorial Civic Center in Lubbock, Texas. The festival is the largest fine arts and crafts show in West Texas. Since its establishment in 1978, the Lubbock Arts Festival focuses on visual, performing, culinary, and children's art. The 2013 Lubbock Arts Festival drew a record attendance of over 30,000. In 2014, the Silent Wings Museum participated in the festival.

A virtual festival was created in 2020, caused by the COVID-19 pandemic.

References

External links
Official website

Festivals in Texas
Arts festivals in the United States
Annual events in Texas
1978 establishments in Texas
Festivals established in 1978
Events in Lubbock, Texas